The 2023 Tour de France will be the 110th edition of the Tour de France. It will start in Bilbao, Spain on 1 July and end at with the final stage at Champs-Élysées, Paris on 23 July.

Classification standings

Stage 1 
1 July 2023 – Bilbao (Spain),

Stage 2 
2 July 2023 – Vitoria-Gasteiz to San Sebastián (Spain),

Stage 3 
3 July 2023 – Amorebieta-Etxano (Spain) to Bayonne,

Stage 4 
4 July 2023 – Dax to Nogaro,

Stage 5 
5 July 2023 – Pau to Laruns,

Stage 6 
6 July 2023 – Tarbes to Cauterets,

Stage 7 
7 July 2023 – Mont-de-Marsan to Bordeaux,

Stage 8 
8 July 2023 – Libourne to Limoges,

Stage 9 
9 July 2023 – Saint-Léonard-de-Noblat to Puy de Dôme,

Rest day 1 
10 July 2023 – Clermont-Ferrand

Stage 10 
11 July 2023 – Clermont-Ferrand to Moulins,

Stage 11 
12 July 2023 – Roanne to Belleville-en-Beaujolais,

References 

2023 Tour de France
Tour de France stages